Faruk Hujdurović (born 14 May 1970) is a Bosnian-Herzegovinian retired footballer who played as a centre-back.

Club career
Hujdurović played with OFK Beograd in the 1993–94 First League of FR Yugoslavia.  He also played for another Serbian club, FK Hajduk Kula, before moving to NK Celje playing in the Slovenian PrvaLiga. His career will start rising from this point, after Slovenia, his next stop was Austria, where he played three years with SV Ried in the Austrian Bundesliga and winning the Austrian Cup right in his first season there.

German Bundesliga side FC Energie Cottbus brought him during the winter-break of the 2000–01 season. He played three seasons in Cottbus in German highest level. Afterwards he stayed in Germany and played for several lower-level clubs, most notably for Carl Zeiss Jena.

There are sources that misspell his surname as Hajdurovic or Hajdukovic.

International career
He made his debut for Bosnia and Herzegovina in an October 1999 European Championship qualification match away against Scotland and has earned a total of 11 caps, scoring no goals. His final international was a March 2002 friendly match against Macedonia.

Honours
SV Ried
 Austrian Cup: 1997–98

References

1970 births
Living people
People from Bijeljina
Association football central defenders
Bosnia and Herzegovina footballers
Bosnia and Herzegovina international footballers
OFK Beograd players
FK Hajduk Kula players
NK Celje players
SV Ried players
FC Energie Cottbus players
FC Carl Zeiss Jena players
VFC Plauen players
VfB Pößneck players
First League of Serbia and Montenegro players
Slovenian PrvaLiga players
Austrian Football Bundesliga players
Bundesliga players
2. Bundesliga players
Oberliga (football) players
Regionalliga players
Bosnia and Herzegovina expatriate footballers
Expatriate footballers in Serbia and Montenegro
Bosnia and Herzegovina expatriate sportspeople in Serbia and Montenegro
Expatriate footballers in Slovenia
Bosnia and Herzegovina expatriate sportspeople in Slovenia
Expatriate footballers in Austria
Bosnia and Herzegovina expatriate sportspeople in Austria
Expatriate footballers in Germany
Bosnia and Herzegovina expatriate sportspeople in Germany